The 1986 Division I NCAA Men's Lacrosse Championship game was played at Delaware Stadium in front of 9,765 fans. Fifth seeded North Carolina capped off an 11 and 3 season with its third NCAA championship, as they upset University of Virginia 10 to 9 in overtime.

Tournament overview

Gary Seivold, who scored the game winner in overtime had two goals and two assists for North Carolina. Seivold's goal with 2:10 left in overtime gave Carolina the 10–9 victory over Virginia at Newark, Del. Virginia's Will Rosebro had tied the game at nine with 1:05 left in the fourth quarter.

Seivold led all tournament scorers with 12 goals and was named the tournament's outstanding player. This tournament was notable because for the first time in nine seasons Johns Hopkins was not in the tournament finals, having been upset in overtime by North Carolina. The tournament was also notable for the expansion in the tournament format to ten teams, from eight, with two play-in games.

Tournament results 

(i) one overtime

Tournament boxscores

Tournament Finals

Tournament Semi-finals

Tournament Quarterfinals

Tournament First Round

All-Tournament Team
Gary Seivold, University of North Carolina (Named the tournament's Most Outstanding Player)

See also
 NCAA Men's Lacrosse Championship

References

External links
Tar Heels Capture NCAA Lacrosse Crown

NCAA Division I Men's Lacrosse Championship
NCAA Division I Men's Lacrosse Championship
NCAA Division I Men's Lacrosse Championship
NCAA Division I Men's Lacrosse Championship
NCAA Division I Men's Lacrosse Championship